JSC Design Bureau for Special Machine-Building (KB SM) is a Soviet-Russian space rockets industry enterprise. Currently, it is part of Almaz-Antey.

KB SM developed and produced a number of launch systems for air defence, Navy and Strategic Missile Troops.

Currently, KB SM develop reinforced concrete containers for long-term storage and transportation of spent nuclear fuel and ship-based nuclear power plants TUK108/1. KB SM is responsible for the creation of railway cranes carrying 80 tons or 150 tons for the Soviet/Russian Ministry of Railways.

History
Founded by the order of People's Commissar of Armaments no. 110 on March 21, 1945 in accordance with the decree of the USSR State Committee of Defense no. 7739 on March 8, 1945, under the name Naval artillery central design bureau - MATsBK, it was the Leningrad branch of Grabin's Central Artillery Design Bureau.

Since 1948 it is known as Central Design Bureau no. 34 (CKB-34) and since 1966 as KBSM (Design bureau of mechanization). Since 1989, bureau received its current name, Spetsmash (also KB SM). Ilya Ivanov, artillery and missile designer and scientist, became the first head of KB. After 1959, his successors were A.M. Shakhov (1959—1974), S. P. Kovalis (1974—1987), and N. A. Trofimov (1987—2007).

References

External links 
  Official site of KB SM (кбсм.рф)
 KBSM: Ensuring reliable launches
  KBSM on Almaz-Antey website

1945 establishments in Russia
Defence companies of the Soviet Union
Science and technology in the Soviet Union
Almaz-Antey
Manufacturing companies established in 1945
Space industry companies of Russia
Companies based in Saint Petersburg
Special Machine-Building